Eva Felicitas Habermann (born 16 January 1976) is a German actress who has appeared in numerous films and TV series.  She is best known for playing the role of Zev Bellringer in the television series Lexx.

While studying for (the German equivalent of) her Senior High School diploma ("Advanced Placement" courses only), Habermann received singing and dancing lessons. Soon after graduation, she obtained her first television role in Lexx. She also moderated the children Pumuckl TV broadcast on German TV (1995/1996). Habermann appeared in the ZDF series Rosa Roth and the ARD series Gegen den Wind as well as appearing in the Rosamunde Pilcher film Two Sisters.  

Due to two year hiatus between seasons 1 and 2, scheduling conflicts, she was unable to commit to the second season of Lexx, although she agreed to appear in the first two episodes, allowing the writers to end her character properly.

In 1999, she took drama lessons and played in such German TV series as Tatort, Der Ermittler, Die Kommissarin and .In 2005, she was in the new episodes of the twenty-year-old series The Black Forest Clinic and in 2006 she was seen in the TV movie In Heaven You Write Love Differently alongside Erol Sander.

In 2008, she played again with Sander the role of Olivia O'Rourke in the film Olivia and Jai by Rebecca Ryman. Her comedy roles included Angel Express (1999),  (2002) and Angst (2003).

In  (2005) she played the role of Leah Diehl. She appeared alongside Xenia Seeberg, who had succeeded her on Lexx.

In 2020, she appeared in the horror movie Cyst as nurse Patirica.

Filmography

Films
 Star Command (1996, TV film), as Ensign Johanna Pressler
  (1997, TV film), as Lisa Helwig
 Geisterstunde – Fahrstuhl ins Jenseits (1997, TV film), as Anne
 Rosamunde Pilcher: Zwei Schwestern (1997, TV film), as Laurie
 The Hairdresser and the Millionaire (1998, TV film), as Anna Gunther 
 Angel Express (1998), as Svenja
 Witness to a Kill (2001), as Monica IMDB link
  (2002), as Heidi
 Jenseits des Regenbogens (2002, TV film), as Tina Berger 
 Angst (2003), as Laura
 Inga Lindström: Sehnsucht nach Marielund (2004, TV film), as Lena Lagerberg
 Barbara Wood: Curse This House (2004, TV film), as Leyla Bolton  
 Casting About (2005), as herself
  (2005), as Leah Diehl
  (2006, TV film), as Sarah Ripley
 Im Himmel schreibt man Liebe anders (2006, TV film), as Emily Seehauser
 Utta Danella: Tanz auf dem Regenbogen (2007, TV film), as Hanna Stetten 
 Rebecca Ryman: Olivia and Jai (2008, TV film), as Olivia O'Rourke 
  (2008), as Nina Schneider
 Vier Tage Toskana (2008, TV film), as Valerie Dorn
 Germany 09 (2009)
  (2011), as Martha Pansegrau 
 Rosamunde Pilcher: Englischer Wein (2011, TV film), as Hannah Powell 
  (2015), as Sigyn 
 The Terror Stalkers (2015) as Ingrid 
 Rhein-Lahn Krimi: Jammertal (2017) as Polizistin Elfi 
  (2020), as Vanessa Majer
 Sky Sharks (2020), as Diabla Richter
 Cyst (2020) as nurse Patricia

TV series
 Immenhof (18 episodes, 1994–1995), as Melanie
 Gegen den Wind (1 episode, 1995), as Paula
  (1 episode, 1997), as Ricky
 Lexx (6 episodes, 1997–1998), as Zev Bellringer 
 Inspector Rex (Episode: Das letzte Match, 1998), as Karin Klein
 Rosa Roth (Episode: Wintersaat, 1999), as Carmen
 Die Strandclique (39 episodes, 1999–2002), as Viola Kimmling
 Code Name: Eternity (Episode: Lose Your Dreams, 2000), as Dr. Rosalind Steiner
 Tatort (Episode: Verhängnisvolle Begierde, 2001), as Sonja Wasberg
  (9 episodes, 2002–2003), as Lena Heitmann
 Der Landarzt (Episode: Hauptverhandlung, 2007), as Jennifer Struck
 Unsere Farm in Irland (8 episodes, 2007–2010), as Erin O'Toole
 Alarm für Cobra 11 – Die Autobahnpolizei (Episode: Dog Days, 2012), as Sabine Weber

References

External links 

 
 

German film actresses
German television actresses
1976 births
Living people
Actresses from Hamburg
20th-century German actresses
21st-century German actresses